Lower Nicola Indian Band is a Nlaka'pamux First Nations government, located in the Central Interior region of the Canadian province of British Columbia.

The Lower Nicola Indian Band reserve community and offices are located at Shulus, also known as Lower Nicola, six kilometres west of Merritt, British Columbia, the main urban centre in the region between the Lower Mainland and Kamloops.

Chief and Councillors

Chief
Aaron Sam

Councillors
Harold Joe
Art Dick
Robert Sterling
Molly Toodlican
Nicholas Peterson
Clyde Sam
Clarence Basil
Clarence Bigfoot

Reserves
Lower Nicola Indian Band has jurisdiction over the following reserves:
 Nicola Mameet 1 - 11,350 Acres - 581 Residents
 Joeyaska 2 - 320 Acres - 42 Residents
 Pipseul 3 - 220 Acres
 Zoht 4 - 500 Acres - 35 Residents
 Zoht 5 - 160 Acres
 Logan's 6 - 45 Acres
 Hamilton Creek 7 - 4,400 Acres - 42 Residents
 Speous 8 - 280 Acres
 Zoht 14 - 160 Acres
 Hihium Lake 6 (Shared between Upper Nicola, Lower Nicola, Bonaparte, and Tk’emlúps te Secwépemc Bands) - 78 Acres

See also
Scw'exmx
Thompson language

References

External links
Lower Nicola Indian Band website
Indian and Northern Affairs Canada - First Nation Detail

Nlaka'pamux governments
Nicola Country